The Guaiquinima whitestart (Myioborus cardonai), also known as the Guaiquinima redstart, saffron-breasted whitestart or saffron-breasted redstart, is a species of bird in the family Parulidae. It is endemic to humid highland forests on Cerro Guaiquinima in south-eastern Venezuela. It is threatened by habitat loss.

References

Guaiquinima whitestart
Endemic birds of Venezuela
Guaiquinima whitestart
Guaiquinima whitestart
Taxonomy articles created by Polbot